Colonia Lapin is a settlement located near the town of Rivera in the southwest region of the Province of Buenos Aires, Argentina, in the Municipality of Adolfo Alsina.

History 
Jewish immigrants founded Colonia Lapin on November 6, 1919.  Colonia Lapin was originally settled by twenty five families from Colonia Esmeralda (Bernasconi) in the Province of Buenos Aires due to the unfavorable conditions, given the climate and the lack of drinking water.  Mr. Eusebio Lapin, the Director of the Jewish Colonization Association, brought about the colonization that had listened the sufferings of these colonists.  He was able to acquire  of land from Baron Maurice de Hirsch of Estación Rivera to pass on to the colonists.  In return, the families gave the Baron a share of the crops.
The colony was originally registered as Phillippson No 3, but its first settlers carried out the procedures to call it "Colonia Lapin", in recognition and gratitude to Eusebio Lapin.

In 1921 more families arrived and the colony began to have life.  When the Colony was installed, no services or commerce existed.  By 1921 significant economic, social, and spiritual needs brought about different institutions such as a primary school, Hebrew school, synagogue, and an arts center/theater/library.

While “Colonia Lapin” still remains, most of the residents have left and many of the farms have been consolidated.  The theater still exists and a monument has been erected in dedication to the founding families.

External links 

 History of Colonia Lapin

Populated places established in 1919
Populated places in Buenos Aires Province
Jewish Argentine settlements
Adolfo Alsina Partido
Cities in Argentina
Argentina